Stéphane Houdet and Nicolas Peifer defeated the defending champions Maikel Scheffers and Ronald Vink in the final, 6–3, 6–1 to win the men's doubles wheelchair tennis title at the 2011 US Open.

Seeds
 Maikel Scheffers /  Ronald Vink (final)
 Stéphane Houdet /  Nicolas Peifer (champions)

Doubles

Finals

External links
Main Draw

Wheelchair Men's Doubles
U.S. Open, 2011 Men's Doubles